Shirazi salad ( sālād shirāzi) is an Iranian salad that originated from and is named after Shiraz in southern Iran. It is a relatively modern dish, dating to sometime after the introduction of the tomato to Iran at the end of the nineteenth century in the Qajar era. Its primary ingredients are cucumber, tomato, onion, olive oil, herbal spices and verjuice, although lime juice is sometimes used in its preparation. In Iran, it is eaten in the summer as a side dish on its own, and year-round as a side dish alongside meat-based foods such as kebab and as a side dish before and after meals. Shirazi salad is sometimes served as an accompaniment to rice such as loobia polo, an Iranian rice dish made with green beans and tomatoes. Cookbook author Jila Dana-Haeri describes it as a refreshing dish during the summer.

Shirazi salad has been described as being akin to a national salad in Iran, and it is a common meal accompaniment. It may also be used in a manner similar to that of a condiment, to reduce the spiciness of stews. It typically has a crisp and moist texture, and is somewhat similar to pico de gallo and Israeli salad.

Ingredients

The primary ingredients of Shirazi salad consist of small, finely-diced cucumber, tomato and onion, which is mixed with verjuice (or sometimes fresh lemon or lime juice) and some dried mint. Olive oil, salt, and pepper may be used, and additional ingredients may include chopped mint, parsley, scallions, dill, sumac, and red vinegar. The salad may have a sour and salty flavor, and its flavor may increase after being set for an hour or longer before serving, which allows time for the flavors to intermingle. It may be served with breads such as pita and lavash, or with cheese and/or walnuts.

See also

 Afghan salad
 Arab salad
 Pico de gallo
 Çoban salatası
 Israeli salad
 Kachumbari
 Serbian salad
 List of salads

References

Further reading

External links 
 How to make Shirazi Salad
 Salad Shirazi ~ Persian Salad From City Of Shiraz

Salads
Iranian cuisine
Culture in Shiraz